Feudal fragmentation being a stage in the development of certain feudal states, in which it is split into smaller regional state structures, each characterized by significant autonomy if not outright independence and ruled by a high-ranking noble such as a prince or a duke. Feudal fragmentation is usually associated with European history, particularly during the Middle Ages.

Feudal fragmentation occurs after the death of the legitimate ruler leaves no clear heirs, and rulers of various subdivisions of the original state fail at electing or agreeing on a new leader for the previous, larger entity. In some cases (for example, the Holy Roman Empire) such a leader may be elected, yet wield much lesser powers than those of his predecessor. Feudal fragmentation is related to the concepts of agnatic seniority and principate.

This phenomenon has occurred in the history of several countries and regions:
 In the history of England, the Heptarchy
 In the history of Poland, the regionalization or fragmentation of Poland refers to the period following the testament of Bolesław III Wrymouth (1138) that led to the split of the Kingdom of Poland into several mostly independent provinces, unified only by Ladislaus the Short approximately two centuries later, in the early 14th century
 In the history of Belarus, Russia and Ukraine the period of fragmentation that started from around the 12th century. In Eastern territories it lasted up until 1547, the year of the ascension of Ivan IV to the throne of the Grand Duchy of Moscow
In the history of Bulgaria, the late 14th century fragmentation of the Second Bulgarian Empire
In the history of Serbia, the Fall of the Serbian Empire (1371–95)
In the history of Germany, the period described as Kleinstaaterei lasted from the 13th century (the demise of the Hohenstaufen dynasty and the rise of the Holy Roman Empire) to 1871 (the unification of the German states into the German Empire)
After the extinction of the Duchy of Burgundy, some of its territory was absorbed by France's Louis XI, while its territory in the Low Countries (the Burgundian Netherlands) became the Habsburg Netherlands (also called the Seventeen Provinces), which itself splintered into the Spanish Netherlands and the Dutch Republic
In the history of France, the period after the fall of the Carolingian dynasty and death of Charlemagne to its unification by Louis XI (see also Crown lands of France)
In the history of Italy, the period from the invasion of Italy by the Lombards (which occurred shortly after Italy was united under the Byzantine Empire as a result of the Gothic War) until Italian unification

According to Samir Amin, feudal fragmentation has been mostly a European phenomenon and did not occur in the history of China or Islamic Middle Eastern states. At the same time, the term feudal fragmentation has been used in the context of history of China (the Warring States period) and history of Japan (the Sengoku period).

See also
Balkanization
Duchies of Silesia
Decentralization
Kleinstaaterei
Gavelkind
Petty kingdom

Notes

References
 Jansen, Marius B. (1995). The Emergence of Meiji Japan. Cambridge: Cambridge University Press. ; ;  OCLC 60261738

Feudalism